The 1985–86 Arkansas–Little Rock Trojans men's basketball team represented the University of Arkansas at Little Rock during the 1985–86 NCAA Division I men's basketball season. The Trojans, led by head coach Mike Newell, played their home games at Barton Coliseum and were members of the Trans America Athletic Conference. They finished the season with a record of 23–11, 12–2 in TAAC play. They won the 1986 TAAC men's basketball tournament to earn an automatic bid in the 1986 NCAA Division I men's basketball tournament. After knocking off No. 3 seed Notre Dame in the opening round, the Trojans lost to NC State, 80–66 in 2OT, in the round of 32.

With the NCAA Tournament's expansion to 64 teams the year prior, Arkansas–Little Rock joined Cleveland State as the first No. 14 seeds to defeat a No. 3 seed. Cleveland State followed their opening round victory with another to become the first No. 14 seed to reach the Sweet Sixteen.

Roster

Schedule and results
 
|-
!colspan=9 style=| Regular season

|-
!colspan=9 style=| TAAC tournament

|-
!colspan=9 style=| NCAA tournament

Rankings

Awards and honors
Myron Jackson – TAAC Player of the Year
Mike Newell – TAAC Coach of the Year

References

Little Rock Trojans men's basketball seasons
Arkansas-Little Rock
Arkansas-Little Rock
Arkansas-Little Rock Trojans men's basketball team
Arkansas-Little Rock Trojans men's basketball team